Wallace Lake is a freshwater lake in Caddo Parish, in northwestern Louisiana, United States. The lake is much wider than it is tall. However, the actual area of the lake varies drastically annually. The lake has a dam that runs water out to form Wallace Bayou, which combines with Bayou Pierre (Louisiana).

Ecology
Wallace Lake has bald cypress trees growing in the middle of it, giving it the appearance of a light forest. The lake boasts many types of fish which include northern pike, redear sunfish, crappie, catfish, carp, black bass, bream, buffalo, gar, and bowfin.

Dam
The Wallace Lake Dam is a dam that sits on the east side of the lake. Wallace Bayou is formed out of the water flowing from the dam, and is eventually met by Bayou Pierre. The dam exists to prevent flooding of Bayou Pierre. The dam was constructed from July 1941 to December 1946. It is managed by the US Army Corps of Engineers. It is estimated that the dam has prevented $24.7 million in damages from occurring

See also

 Cross Lake

References

Lakes of Louisiana
Caddo Parish, Louisiana